In Fields of Pestilent Grief is a studio album by the Norwegian funeral doom metal band Funeral. It was their first full-length studio album since their album Tragedies.

Background
Einar Fredriksen, the then-bassist of Funeral, gave several reasons for the seven-year gap in between albums in an interview with doom-metal.com. Some of those reasons, according to Fredriksen, was because Funeral's previous label, Arctic Serenades, decided to rip the band off, Toril Snyen was removed from the band (and replacing her proved difficult), finding a label, and lack of musical motivation from some band members. Eventually, the band got to recording this album, and according to Einar, it still had the trademarks of old Funeral, but was more inspired by their anger due to the certain aforementioned circumstances.

This was Einar Fredriksen's last interview before committing suicide in January 2003.

Track listing

References

2002 albums
Funeral (band) albums